Atlético Olympic Football Club is a Burundian football club located in Bujumbura, Burundi. It currently plays in the Burundi Premier League.
The club is coached by Dieudonné Mugunga formerly of Bukavu Dawa of Linafoot Super League,DRC.He is the fifth coach in ten months after stints by Nahimana Hussein,Omar Ntakagero,Amidou Hassan and Nzeyimana Mailo.

History 
The club was started in 2005 as Atletico Olympique in Bujumbura City.In 2020,they won promotion the Primus League.Businessman Apollinaire Kazohera bought the club and relocated it to Muyinga,a city located in northern Burundi and the capital of Muyinga Province.The team then changed its name to Atlético New Oil Academy Muyinga.

Squad

Honours
Burundi Premier League: 2
2004, 2011

Burundian Cup: 1
2000

Performance in CAF competitions
CAF Champions League: 1 appearance
2012 – Preliminary Round

CAF Confederation Cup: 1 appearance
2010 – Preliminary Round

References

Football clubs in Burundi